Events from the year 1729 in France

Incumbents
 Monarch – Louis XV

Events

9th November 1729 France signed The Treaty of Seville with Britain and Spain bringing an end to the Angelo-Spanish War started in 1727.

Births
 4 September – Dauphin Louis, Son of Louis XV (d. 1765)

Full date missing

Louis Antoine de Bougainville, admiral and explorer (died 1811)
Gaétan Vestris, dancer (died 1808)
Jean-Baptiste Marie de Piquet, Marquess of Méjanes, aristocrat and book collector (died 1786)

Deaths
June 27 – Élisabeth Jacquet de La Guerre, French harpsichordist and composer (b. 1665)

Full date missing
Simon de la Loubère, diplomat, mathematician and poet (born 1642)
Giacomo F. Maraldi, astronomer and mathematician (born 1665)
Honoré Tournély, Catholic theologian (born 1658)
Nicolas Ravot d'Ombreval, magistrate (born 1680)

See also

References

1720s in France